The 1934 Monaco Grand Prix (formally the VI Grand Prix de Monaco) was a Grand Prix motor race held on 2 April 1934 at Circuit de Monaco in and out of Monte Carlo. The race comprised 100 laps of a 3.180km circuit, for a total race distance of 318.0km.

The Association Internationale des Automobile Clubs Reconnus (AIACR) had announced on 12 October 1932 that a new Grand Prix formula will go into effect for the 1934 season, and the 1934 Monaco Grand Prix was the first Grand Épreuve event run under the new regulations.  Although one of the new rules required the race distance to be over 500 km, Monaco GP was permitted to be run for 100 laps or 318 km, as the time required to complete 100 laps at the slow Circuit de Monaco was comparable to 500 km at faster tracks such as Monza.

The race was won by Guy Moll, a newly recruited Algerian of Scuderia Ferrari, driving an Alfa Romeo Tipo B/P3.  In addition to winning the first race after the enrollment to the Ferrari team, Moll (at 23 years and 10 months old) remained the youngest driver to have won a Monaco GP until Lewis Hamilton (at 23 years and 4 months) won in 2008.

Starting grid

Classification 

Fastest Lap:  Carlo Felice Trossi (Alfa Romeo Tipo B/P3), 2m00s

References 

Monaco Grand Prix
Monaco Grand Prix